Joe Garden (born March 10, 1970) is an American comedy writer.  He was a features editor at The Onion, an American satirical news organisation, where he created the characters Jim Anchower and Jackie Harvey. He has also had at least one cameo in the publication as himself.

He has co-written three books, The Dangerous Book for Dogs, The Devious Book for Cats and The New Vampire's Handbook: A Guide for the Recently Turned Creature of the Night. He has also been a contributing writer for the PBS animated children's program WordGirl, has appeared in the film Bad Meat, and was the voice of Phil Cabinet in the Aqua Teen Hunger Force episode “Hypno-Germ.”

Books

Trivia

In 2009, Garden contributed to the introduction of a novelty book "This Is Why You're Fat: Where Dreams Become Heart Attacks" (October 27, 2009), a book co-authored by Richard Blakeley.

After it was announced that Conan O'Brien would be taking over Jay Leno's hosting duties on The Tonight Show, Garden launched a mock Internet campaign titled "Vote Joe Garden!" with the aim of democratizing the selection of O’Brien's replacement for Late Night.  The bid was unsuccessful as NBC announced that Jimmy Fallon would replace O’Brien in 2009.

Notes

External links
  Interview about dog books and The Dangerous Book For Dogs on NPR's Weekend Edition
  Joe Garden weighs in on the Hillary Clinton Campaign on NPR's Morning Edition
  Joe Garden's website for his campaign for Late Night
  The Sound Of Young America interviews Joe Garden
  Joe Garden and fellow Onion editors Joe Randazzo and Scott Dikkers on WNYC's Leonard Lopate Show Discuss Our Dumb World

The Onion people
1970 births
Living people
American newspaper editors
American comedy writers
People from Richland Center, Wisconsin